Baharestan County is in Tehran province, Iran. The capital of the county is the city of Golestan. At the 2006 census, the county's population (as Bostan and Golestan Districts of Robat Karim County) was 486,484 in 117,708 households. They were separated from the county in 2011 to become Baharestan County. The following census in 2011 counted 523,636 people in 143,512 households. At the 2016 census, the county's population was 536,329 in 156,791 households.

Administrative divisions

The population history and structural changes of Baharestan County's administrative divisions over three consecutive censuses are shown in the following table. The latest census shows two districts, four rural districts, and three cities.

References

 

Counties of Tehran Province